Clyde C. Newkirk (August 29, 1870 - May 15, 1938), who published under the pseudonym, Newton "Newt" Newkirk was an American humorist. He produced a comic strip and various humorous publications.

Newkirk was hired by the Boston Post in 1901. His Bingville Bugle comic strip inspired Bing Crosby's nickname during Crosby's childhood. In the comic strip, Bingo was pear-shaped  with protruding ears.

References

American humorists
1870 births
1938 deaths
The Boston Post people